Metahistory may refer to

Metahistory (concept), the history of history writing, a part of the discipline of historiography
Metahistory: The Historical Imagination in Nineteenth-century Europe, 1973 book by Hayden White